André Lopes may refer to:

 André Lopes (volleyball) (born 1982), Portuguese volleyball player
 André Lopes (footballer) (born 2002), Portuguese footballer

See also
 Andrey Lopes (born 1978), Brazilian football manager